Melchor de Concha y Toro (October 10, 1833 – July 21, 1892) was a Chilean businessman, lawyer, and politician, and the Marquis of Casa Concha by the Spanish Crown.

Early life
Son of Melchor Santiago de Concha y Cerda and of Damiana de Toro Guzmán. Studied at the Instituto Nacional (National Institute) and at the faculty of law of the University of Chile, receiving his law degree on January 17, 1857. When he entered the University of Chile Faculty of Law, he presented a historical book commended by the university titled Chile during the years 1824 through 1828

Politics

Between 1861 and 1871 he belonged to the Conservative Party, but soon became a moderate liberal.

He entered politics in 1864 after being elected representative of Melipilla. He was reelected as representative until 1886, when he was elected to the Senate representing Santiago. In 1869 he was nominated Minister of Finance by Chilean President José Joaquín Pérez, until August 2, 1870. In 1891 he resigned his post in support of the congressional side of the 1891 Chilean Civil War against then president José Manuel Balmaceda.

Business career
His passion being business, he became the manager of Banco Garantizador.

In 1879 he was president of the Bolivian Huanchaca Company.

Concha y Toro Winery 
In 1883, the Marquis Melchor de Concha y Toro entered the wine-making industry by deciding to plant grapevines in the Maipo River valley. He brought seeds to Chilé from the Bordeaux region of France and hired a French ethnologist Monsieur Labouchere. From this personal project, the Concha y Toro winery was born.

Personal life
He married Emiliana Subercaseaux. Their children included Emiliana Concha de Ossa.

He constructed a mansion in 1875 in Pirque. The mansion stands out by its extensive gardens and its rural Chilean style as well as some French touches.

He died in Santiago on July 21, 1892.

See also
Concha y Toro

References

External links

1833 births
1892 deaths
Chilean Ministers of Finance
Members of the Senate of Chile
Members of the Chamber of Deputies of Chile
Chilean businesspeople
Conservative Party (Chile) politicians